Oxalis rufescens is a species of plant in the family Oxalidaceae. It is endemic to Ecuador.

References

rufescens
Endemic flora of Ecuador
Vulnerable plants
Taxonomy articles created by Polbot